Amobarbital (formerly known as amylobarbitone or sodium amytal as the soluble sodium salt) is a drug that is a barbiturate derivative. It has sedative-hypnotic properties. It is a white crystalline powder with no odor and a slightly bitter taste. It was first synthesized in Germany in 1923. It is considered a short to intermediate acting barbiturate. If amobarbital is taken for extended periods of time, physiological and psychological dependence can develop. Amobarbital withdrawal mimics delirium tremens and may be life-threatening. Amobarbital was manufactured by Eli Lilly and Company in the US under the brand name Amytal in bright blue bullet shaped capsules (known as Pulvules) or pink tablets (known as Diskets) containing 50, 100, or 200 milligrams of the drug.  The drug was also manufactured generically. Amobarbital was widely misused, known as  "Blue Heavens" on the street.  Amytal, as well as Tuinal, a combination drug containing equal quantities of secobarbital and amobarbital, were both manufactured by Eli Lilly until the late-1990s. However, as the popularity of benzodiazepines increased, prescriptions for these medications became increasingly rare beginning in the mid to late-1980s.

Pharmacology
In an in vitro study in rat thalamic slices amobarbital worked by activating GABAA receptors, which decreased input resistance, depressed burst and tonic firing, especially in ventrobasal and intralaminar neurons, while at the same time increasing burst duration and mean conductance at individual chloride channels; this increased both the amplitude and decay time of inhibitory postsynaptic currents.

Amobarbital has been used in a study to inhibit mitochondrial electron transport in the rat heart in an attempt to preserve mitochondrial function following reperfusion.

A 1988 study found that amobarbital increases benzodiazepine receptor binding in vivo with less potency than secobarbital and pentobarbital (in descending order), but greater than phenobarbital and barbital (in descending order). (Secobarbital > pentobarbital > amobarbital > phenobarbital > barbital)

Metabolism
Amobarbital undergoes both hydroxylation to form 3'-hydroxyamobarbital, and N-glucosidation to form 1-(beta-D-glucopyranosyl)-amobarbital.

Indications

Approved
 Anxiety
 Epilepsy
 Insomnia
 Wada test

Unapproved/off-label
When given slowly by an intravenous route, sodium amobarbital has a reputation for acting as a so-called truth serum. Under the influence, a person will divulge information that under normal circumstances they would block. This was most likely due to loss of inhibition. As such, the drug was first employed clinically by Dr. William Bleckwenn at the University of Wisconsin to circumvent inhibitions in psychiatric patients. The use of amobarbital as a truth serum has lost credibility due to the discovery that a subject can be coerced into having a "false memory" of the event.

The drug may be used intravenously to interview patients with catatonic mutism, sometimes combined with caffeine to prevent sleep.

It was used by the United States armed forces during World War II in an attempt to treat shell shock and return soldiers to the front-line duties. This use has since been discontinued as the powerful sedation, cognitive impairment, and dis-coordination induced by the drug greatly reduced soldiers' usefulness in the field. Amobarbital was once manufactured in the US by Eli Lilly Pharmaceuticals under the brand name Amytal in capsule form. It was discontinued in the early 80s, largely replaced by the benzodiazepine family of drugs. Amobarbital was also widely abused, known on the streets as "blue heavens" because of their blue capsule.

Contraindications

The following drugs should be avoided when taking amobarbital:
 Antiarrhythmics, such as verapamil and digoxin
 Antiepileptics, such as phenobarbital or carbamazepine
 Antihistamines, such as doxylamine and clemastine
 Antihypertensives, such as atenolol and propranolol
 Ethanol
 Benzodiazepines, such as diazepam, clonazepam, nitrazepam, alprazolam, or lorazepam
 Chloramphenicol
 Chlorpromazine
 Cyclophosphamide
 Ciclosporin
 Digitoxin
 Doxorubicin
 Doxycycline
 Methoxyflurane
 Metronidazole
 Narcotic analgesics, such as morphine and oxycodone
 Quinine
 Steroids, such as prednisone and cortisone
 Theophylline
 Warfarin

Interactions 

Amobarbital has been known to decrease the effects of hormonal birth control.

Overdose
Some side effects of overdose include confusion (severe); decrease in or loss of reflexes; drowsiness (severe); fever; irritability (continuing); low body temperature; poor judgment; shortness of breath or slow or troubled breathing; slow heartbeat; slurred speech; staggering; trouble in sleeping; unusual movements of the eyes; weakness (severe). Severe overdose may result in death without intervention.

Chemistry

Amobarbital (5-ethyl-5-isoamylbarbituric acid), like all barbiturates, is synthesized by reacting malonic acid derivatives with urea derivatives. In particular, in order to make amobarbital, α-ethyl-α-isoamylmalonic ester is reacted with urea (in the presence of sodium ethoxide).

Society and culture
It has been used to convict alleged murderers such as Andres English-Howard, who strangled his girlfriend to death but claimed innocence. He was surreptitiously administered the drug by his lawyer, and under the influence of it he revealed why he strangled her and under what circumstances.

On the night of August 28, 1951, the housekeeper of actor Robert Walker found him to be in an emotional state. She called Walker's psychiatrist who arrived and administered amobarbital for sedation. Walker was allegedly drinking prior to his emotional outburst, and it is believed the combination of amobarbital and alcohol resulted in a severe reaction. As a result, he passed out and stopped breathing, and all efforts to resuscitate him failed. Walker died at 32 years old. 

The British actor and comedian Tony Hancock killed himself in Australia in 1968 using the drug in combination with alcohol.

Eli Lilly manufactured amobarbital under the brand name Amytal, it was discontinued in the 1980s replaced largely by the benzodiazepine family of drugs. Amytal was also widely abused. Street names for amobarbital include "blues", "blue angels", "blue birds", "blue devils", and "blue heavens" due to their blue capsule.

Cultural references
In Len Deighton's 1967 novel An Expensive Place to Die, a combination of amytal and LSD is used to make the unnamed protagonist respond to questioning about his activities.

In Thomas Pynchon's 1973 novel Gravity's Rainbow, sodium amytal is used by a military intelligence unit as some kind of truth serum to extract Tyrone Slothrop's (the novel's protagonist) ideas on racism of white Americans against Afro-Americans during the 1930s in his home state of Massachusetts (Chapter 1).

In 2001, the Law & Order: Special Victims Unit episode "Repression" (Season 3, Episode 1), a therapist (Shirley Knight) treats her patient with "sodium amytal".  The character Dr. George Huang (BD Wong) claims that the drug leaves a patient so susceptible to suggestion, that the therapist is able to implant false memories in the patient.

In 2003, the animated series Sealab 2021 season 3, episode 7, "Tourist Season", Dr. Quentin Q. Quinn, voiced by Brett Butler, uses "sodium amytal" to induce amnesia in a group of tourists, in order to prevent them from taking action against Sealab as a result of a hare-brained scheme by Capt. Murphy. He gives the dose in a free alcoholic beverage as a parting gift before the tourists leave, and in quantities he describes that could "make an elephant forget". 

In 2022, in "Diophantine Pseudonym", Episode 06 of Dan Brown's The Lost Symbol, sodium amytal is used by the CIA as a truth serum.

See also 
 Blue 88
 Depressant
 Tuinal

Notes 

Hypnotics
Barbiturates
GABAA receptor positive allosteric modulators
German inventions
Eli Lilly and Company brands
Substances discovered in the 1920s